Pa-cha in late Chinese mythology is the god who protects farmers against locusts by eliminating them. Pa-cha is depicted as a naked to the waist human with a beak-like nose. His body beneath the waist resembles a bell (some legends state he was born from a bell) with big crawled bird paws underneath. Hair locks on his head right behind the ears look similar to small corns. In one hand, he carries a crook-neck pumpkin where he puts the locusts in order to kill them. In the other hand, he carries one of the following objects: a sword, golden nugget, wood-made hammer, or a banner with an inscription on it: "I collect locusts and destroy them." 
A ceremony in his honor is said to be held every year after harvesting.

References

Chinese gods